Adam MacDonald (born May 16, 1977) is a Canadian actor, writer, and director. He is known for portraying Josh MacIntosh on the CBC show Being Erica, Peter McGregor on Wild Roses, and Detective Steve Peck on Rookie Blue, and for his guest-starring roles in several other shows, including Murdoch Mysteries and Republic of Doyle.

MacDonald's writing and directing work includes the horror films Backcountry (2014) and Pyewacket (2017), both of which premiered at the Toronto International Film Festival, and the third season of the anthology horror television series Slasher (2019).

Life and career
MacDonald was born and raised in Montreal, and dabbled in acting and music throughout high school. He began to take it seriously in 1997 at the age of 20, when he became "hooked" after participating in an acting class.

MacDonald has starred in several television series throughout his career, in both leading and guest roles. He is known for portraying Josh MacIntosh on the CBC show Being Erica, Peter McGregor on Wild Roses, and Detective Steve Peck on Rookie Blue, and for his guest-starring roles in several other shows, including Murdoch Mysteries and Republic of Doyle. He also starred as Nick McAllister on the short-lived supernatural show Vampire High.

After building a career on screen, MacDonald began writing and directing short films. He struggled to make the move from short films to a feature.

In 2014, MacDonald made his feature film directorial debut with the 2014 nature–survival horror Backcountry. Starring Missy Peregrym, the film is based on the true story of a hungry man-eating bear that attacked Mark Jordan and Jacqueline Perry, in the back country of Missinaibi Lake Provincial Park, North of Chapleau, Ontario in 2005. Production took place in late 2013 with funding from Telefilm Canada and Northern Ontario Heritage Fund. The film premiered at the 2014 Toronto International Film Festival, and received generally positive reviews from critics upon release.

In 2016, MacDonald directed his second feature film, Pyewacket, an occult horror film starring Laurie Holden. The film, which he also wrote, screened in the Contemporary World Cinema section at the 2017 Toronto International Film Festival. It received mixed reviews from critics.

In 2019, MacDonald directed the entire third season of the Netflix anthology horror series, Slasher, titled Solstice. In 2020, it was announced that he will direct the fourth season, titled Flesh & Blood, as well.

MacDonald has expressed his desire to complete a trilogy of feature films featuring women overcoming extreme circumstances, beginning with Backcountry. In 2020, IFC acquired the right to MacDonald's script title Out Come the Wolves, also starring Peregrym.

Filmography

Film

Television

Other media

References

External links
 Official Twitter
 

1977 births
Canadian male film actors
Canadian male television actors
Canadian male voice actors
Living people
Male actors from Montreal
Anglophone Quebec people